Nigehörn is an uninhabited artificial island in the North Sea belonging to the German city of Hamburg.

Geography 
The island is a part of Zone 1 of the Hamburg Wadden Sea National Park.

The sandbank on which Scharhörn and Nigehörn lie is a European Union Natura 2000-designated bird sanctuary, tended to by the environmental group Verein Jordsand. Unlike Scharhörn, where visitors may obtain official permission to visit, public access to Nigehörn is strictly forbidden.

Construction and history 
Nigehörn was constructed in 1989 as a land fill to compensate for ongoing land loss on nearby Scharhörn, which threatened to deprive shorebirds of important breeding grounds. Approximately  of sand were deposited on the sandbank by hydraulic fill to create the core of the new island.

Dune stabilization was achieved using  barriers made from brushwood arranged in a double-circle around the core, with "rays" extending outward from the circles to catch and hold down flying sand. Three eastward-pointing double-bows of similar construction were built across the core to trap and retain sand in the heart of the island. Traces of these patterns can still be seen on aerial photographs of the island today, though they are by now weathered, sand-covered, and (in the western part of the island) eroded.

The newly constructed island measured  in total area. As pioneer flora began to colonise the island, helping the pre-existing structures to hold down sediments, Nigehörn began to grow naturally into the surrounding tidal mudflats.

References 

Artificial islands of Germany
Frisian Islands
Uninhabited islands of Germany
Islands of Hamburg
Nature reserves in Hamburg